Sul América Esporte Clube, commonly known as Sul América, is a Brazilian football club based in Manaus, Amazonas. They won the Campeonato Amazonense two times and competed in the Copa do Brasil once.

History
The club was founded on May 1, 1932.  They won the Campeonato Amazonense in 1992 and in 1993. Sul América competed in the Copa do Brasil in 1993, when they were eliminated in the First Stage by Rio Branco.

Stadium
Sul América Esporte Clube play their home games at Estádio Roberto Simonsen, commonly known as SESI. The stadium has a maximum capacity of 5,000 people. Until July 2010, the club played their home games at Vivaldão. Vivaldão had a maximum capacity of 31,000 people.

Achievements

 Campeonato Amazonense:
 Winners (2): 1992, 1993

References

External links
 Official website

Football clubs in Amazonas (Brazilian state)
Association football clubs established in 1932
1932 establishments in Brazil